Corculum is a genus of small saltwater clams, marine bivalve molluscs in the family Cardiidae, the cockles.  They maintain Symbiodinium dinoflagellates as symbionts.

Species
Species in the genus Corculum are:

References

Cardiidae
Bivalve genera
Taxa named by Peter Friedrich Röding